Trousers is a 1920 British silent romance film directed by Bertram Phillips and starring Queenie Thomas, Jack Leigh and Fred Morgan. The screenplay concerns a woman who dresses like a man and falls in love.

Cast
 Queenie Thomas – Trousers 
 Jack Leigh – Martin Chester 
 Fred Morgan – Professor Dewbiggin 
 Bernard Vaughan – Peter Salt 
 Barbara Leigh – Trousers as a child 
 Elizabeth Herbert

References

External links

1920 films
1920s romance films
Films directed by Bertram Phillips
British silent feature films
British black-and-white films
British romance films
1920s English-language films
1920s British films